is a former Japanese football player.

Club statistics

References

External links

 Masateru Akita at footballjapan

1982 births
Living people
University of Tsukuba alumni
Association football people from Chiba Prefecture
Japanese footballers
J2 League players
Mito HollyHock players
Zweigen Kanazawa players
Association football midfielders